Skarberget is a ferry port in the municipality of Narvik (formerly in Tysfjord) in Nordland, Norway. It is located at the eastern side of Tysfjorden. Ferries operate from Skarberget across Tysfjorden to Bognes as part of the European route E6 highway.

References

Ferry quays in Nordland
Narvik